Maa Mangala Temple is a Hindu Shakti Pitha located in Kakatpur of Odisha, on the eastern coast of India.

Overview
This is a 15th-century temple and a symbol of ancient Shakti Pithas of Kalinga. The temple is situated at the eastern bank of holy river Prachi which was named Saraswati before.

Maa Mangala is a Hindu goddess who is one of the manifestations of SHAKTI. In ancient times, Buddhist monks used to symbolize Maa Mangala as goddess Tara. Now the deity worshiped as one of manifestations of Goddess Durga in the hymn of the goddess Vanadurga.

Maa Mangala is the symbol of qualities like of peace, power, happiness, love, purity, knowledge & truth.
ମଙ୍ଗଳ ଶବ୍ଦ ମୋକ୍ଷ , ଶୁଭ ଆଦି ଅର୍ଥ କୁ ବୁଝାଇଥାଏ ଓ ଆ' କାର ଟି ପ୍ରଦାନ କରିବା ଅର୍ଥ କୁ ବୁଝାଇଥାଏ। ମା' ସମସ୍ତ ପ୍ରକାରର ଶୁଭତା କୁ ପ୍ରଦାନ କରୁଥିବାରୁ ତାଙ୍କର ନାମ ସର୍ବମଙ୍ଗଳା ହୋଇଅଛି ।
ମଙ୍ଗଳ ଶବଦ ଅଟେ ମୋକ୍ଷାର୍ଥ ବୋଧକ
ଆ' କାର ଅଟଇ ଦାତୃ ଶବଦ ବା ଦୃକ ।
ସେ ସକାଶୁ ସର୍ବଶୁଭଦାତ୍ରୀ ସେ ଅଟନ୍ତି
ସର୍ବମଙ୍ଗଳା ନାମକୁ ବହି ସେ ଅଛନ୍ତି ।।
ବ୍ରହ୍ମ ବୈବର୍ତ୍ତ ପୁରାଣ , ପ୍ରକୃତି ଖଣ୍ଡ , ଷଷ୍ଠିତମ ଅଧ୍ୟାୟ

Temple architecture & Cult
The carvings of the deity Mangala is in typical Odia style, having khilana & prabha back to her sitting place. The architecture of temple is a typical example of Utkaliya Peedha Vimana Style.

There is a bed made of solid stone on which it is said Maa Mangala rests after touring the entire universe every day.  As if to attest to this, the bed looks worn out in just the same way it would if it were in use for centuries.

History of the Evolution of the Deity 
There is no written prove based on the evolution of the Deity. The legend behind the evolution has no base in ancient days. The myth is that in ancient times Utkala had a good commercial relationship with different islands like Singhala, Java, Sumatra etc. Demon Ravana used to worship goddess Mangala with his great devotion and became the most powerful by the blessing of the Deity. After the victory of Lord Ram, goddess was taken to Utkala from Singhala by a Sadhaba (one who do business with other country & islands). At that time the Prachi civilization was getting civilized and developed more day by day & was only path to enter Utkala. He established the Deity Mangala in Prachi valley.

Legend 

Evolution of the name of the deity as Maa Mangala hails from a legend believed by the locals of Kakatpur village. Goddess Managla kept herself hidden under the deep water of river Prachi. Once a boatman was sailing his boat across river Prachi. At that time the river was outpouring and flooded so he was unable to sail his boat to the middle of the river. He spent whole day and night but not able to sail his boat and during early morning, before the dawn, Goddess Mangala came in his dream and asked him to recover her from the water and to establish her in nearby Mangalapur village. The boatman dived into the water and able to find the deity from the bed of the river. Then as per the direction of the Goddess he established the figure of the deity in a temple in Mangalapur village. After this the boatman saw a black crow dived into the water and did not come out of the water for hours and days, the crow detained inside the water of river Prachi exactly in the same place from where he recovered the figure of Goddess Mangala. In Odia language, Crow means Kaa-kaw (କାକ) and Detained means Aw-taw-kaw (ଅଟକ). So by combining the two words it becomes Kaka-Atka, so during the course of time the Mangalapur village is known as Kakata (Kaka-Atka) pur and the Goddess is known as Kakatpur Mangala. That time before 500 years ago Local Zamindar Roychudamoni family has made the mandir at Kakatpur with all the Sebak arrangement. This Mandir was Made by Panchanan Mitra (Roychudamoni) on 1548 AD.

Association with Jagannath Temple, Puri
Every twelve to nineteen years when the wooden icons of Jagannath, Balabhadra and Subhadra of the Jagannath Temple, Puri are replaced during the Nabakalevara rite, Priests of the temple in Puri pray to Mangala in the Kakatpur temple to give them divine guidance. The goddess appears in their dreams and reveals the location of the three divine Daru Bramha trees from which idols of the deities are made.

DailyRituals
ଦ୍ବାରଫିଟା ଓ ମଙ୍ଗଳାଳତି
ପ୍ରତ୍ୟହ ବ୍ରାହ୍ମ ମୁହୂର୍ତ୍ତରେ ମନ୍ଦିର ଖୋଲେ। ପରିଷ୍କାର ଭାବେ ଝାଡୁ ହୋଇ ଧୌତ କରାଯାଏ। ପୂଜାପଣ୍ଡା ଭିତର କବାଟ ଖୋଲନ୍ତି। ଖଟଶେଯ ଉଠାନ୍ତି। ନିର୍ମଳ ଶଙ୍ଖ ଜଳରେ ଦେବୀ ଙ୍କର ମୁଖ ପ୍ରକ୍ଷାଳନ କରାନ୍ତି। ଘଣ୍ଟ ଘଣ୍ଟା ମଧ୍ୟରେ ସାତଗୋଟି ବଳିତା ସହ ସପ୍ତମୁଖୀ ଦୀପରେ ମଙ୍ଗଳାଳତି କରାନ୍ତି।ମଙ୍ଗଳାଳତୀ ପରେ ମା ଙ୍କର ମାର୍ଜନା ପାଇଁ ଜଗମୋହନ ଦ୍ବାର ବନ୍ଦ କରିଦିଯାଏ
ଉଲାଗି,ମାର୍ଜନା,ବେଶ ଓ ମହାପ୍ରସାଦ ସମର୍ପଣ
ମୁଖଶାଳା ର ଦ୍ବାର ବନ୍ଦ କରାଯିବାପରେ , ପ୍ରଥମେ କୁମ୍ଭାଟୁଆ ଦାନ୍ତକାଠିରେ ମା ଙ୍କର ଦନ୍ତ ମାର୍ଜନ କରାଯାଏ। ସମସ୍ତ ଅଳଙ୍କାର, ଫୁଲ ଓ ବସ୍ତ୍ର ଉଲାଗି କରାଯାଏ। ବେଢା ମଧ୍ୟସ୍ଥ ନିର୍ଦ୍ଧିଷ୍ଟ ବାମ୍ଫି ରୁ ଜଳ ଅଣାଯାଏ।ଚୁଆ, ହଳଦୀ, ଗବ୍ୟ ଘୃତ ଓ କ୍ଷୀର ରେ ସ୍ନାନ କରାଯାଏ। ବାସୀ ବସ୍ତ୍ର ଧୌତ କରାଯାଇ ଶୁଖାଯାଏ ଓ ନୂତନ ଶୁଦ୍ଧ ବସ୍ତ୍ର ପିନ୍ଧାଇ ଦିଆଯାଏ। ମା ଙ୍କର ଦୈନନ୍ଦିନର ପରିଧାନ ପାଇଁ ୫ଖଣ୍ଡ ବସ୍ତ୍ର ଆବଶ୍ୟକ ହୋଇଥାଏ। ପିନ୍ଧାବସ୍ତ୍ର ୧ଖଣ୍ଡ, ଉତ୍ତରୀ ୧ଖଣ୍ଡ, ପାଦତଳେ ଆଭରଣ ୧ଖଣ୍ଡ, ପାର୍ଶ୍ୱସ୍ଥ ପରି ମାନଙ୍କ ଆଭରଣ ୧ଖଣ୍ଡ ଓ ବିଗ୍ରହ ପ୍ରଶସ୍ଥ ର ଅବଶିଷ୍ଟ ଉର୍ଦ୍ଧ୍ୱାଶଂ ର ଆବରଣ ୧ଖଣ୍ଡ। ଏହିପରି ମୋଟ ୫ଖଣ୍ଡ।
ଶାଢୀ ପିନ୍ଧାଯିବା ପରେ ମା ଙ୍କ ଦେହରେ ଅଳଙ୍କାର ଲାଗି ହୁଏ।ପାଦରେ ରୂପାର ପାହୁଡ, ବଳା ଓ ପାଉଁଜି। ଅଣ୍ଟାରେ ରୂପାର ଅଣ୍ଟାପଟି ଓ ଗୋଠ। ହାତରେ ରୂପାର ବଟଫଳ, ମୁଠାଚୁଡି ଓ ଖଡୁ। ବାହୁରେ ରୂପାର ତାଡ। କଣ୍ଠରେ ସ୍ୱର୍ଣ୍ଣର ପଦକ। କର୍ଣ୍ଣରେ ସ୍ୱର୍ଣ୍ଣ କର୍ଣ୍ଣଫୁଲ ଓ ପେଣ୍ଡି। ନାକରେ ସ୍ୱର୍ଣ୍ଣ ନୋଥ ଓ ଗୁଣା। କପାଳରେ ସ୍ୱର୍ଣ୍ଣ ଦ୍ୱିତୀୟା ଚନ୍ଦ୍ର ଓ ସ୍ୱର୍ଣ୍ଣ ବୈଷ୍ଣବ ଚିତା। ଚକ୍ଷୁରେ ସ୍ୱର୍ଣ୍ଣଚକ୍ଷୁ। ଭୃଲତାରେ ସ୍ୱର୍ଣ୍ଣ ଭୃଲତା। ଆୟୁଧରେ ପୂର୍ଣ୍ଣଚନ୍ଦ୍ର ଓ ପଦ୍ମକଳିକା। ମସ୍ତକରେ ସ୍ୱର୍ଣ୍ଣ ମୁକୁଟ। ଏ ସମସ୍ତ ଅଳଙ୍କାରକୁ ପ୍ରତିଦିନ ବସ୍ତ୍ର ପରିଧାନ ପରେ ପିନ୍ଧାଇ ଦିଆଯାଇଥାଏ। ପର୍ବ ଦିନମାନଙ୍କରେ ଦେବୀ ସୁନାର ସ୍ୱତନ୍ତ୍ର ମୁକୁଟ, ପଦକ ଓ କଣ୍ଠିମାଳା ଇତ୍ୟାଦି ପରିଧାନ କରିଥାନ୍ତି।
ଅଳଙ୍କାର ଲାଗି ପରେ ୫ଖଣ୍ଡ ଫୁଲମାଳ ମା ଙ୍କୁ ପିନ୍ଧାଇ ଦିଆଯାଏ। ଚନ୍ଦନ ଓ ସିନ୍ଦୂର ଲାଗି କରାଯାଏ। ଶ୍ରୀକ୍ଷେତ୍ର ରୁ ଅଣାଯାଇ ସଂରକ୍ଷିତ ଥିବା ମହାପ୍ରସାଦ ସମର୍ପଣ କରାଯାଏ।
ଅବକାଶ :
ଏହାପରେ ପୂଜାପଣ୍ଡା ଦେବୀ ଙ୍କ ପାଖରେ ପ୍ରଥମେ ଆଲଟ (ପଙ୍ଖା) ସେବା କରନ୍ତି। ତା ପରେ ଚାମର (ଚଅଁର ମୁଠା) ସେବା କରନ୍ତି। ଏତିକିରେ ଦେବୀ ଙ୍କର ପ୍ରାତଃକାଳର ସ୍ନାନ କାର୍ଯ୍ୟ ସମାପିତ ହୋଇଥାଏ।
ଏହାପରେ ଚୁଆ ଓ ଘୃତ ଲଗାଯାଇ ବାହନ ସିଂହଙ୍କୁ ସ୍ନାନ କରାଇ ଦିଆଯାଏ। ପରେ ପରେ ସମସ୍ତ ପାର୍ଶ୍ଵଦେବତାଙ୍କୁ ସ୍ନାନ ଏବଂ ବେଶ ବଢିଥାଏ ।
ବଲ୍ଲଭ ଧୂପ
ସକାଳ ପ୍ରାୟ ୯ ଘଟିକା ସମୟରେ ରୋଷରେ କିଛି କେଳି(ଗଜା) ତିଆରି କରାଯାଏ। ଯୋଗାଣିଆ ଖଇ ଓ ଦହି ଦେଇଥାନ୍ତି। ପ୍ରଥମେ ସୂର୍ଯ୍ୟ ବେଦୀ ରେ ଅଳ୍ପ କିଛି ଖଇ, ଦହି ଓ କେଳି ସୂର୍ଯ୍ୟଦେବଙ୍କୁ ପୂଜା କରାଯାଏ। ଏଥିସହିତ ସୂର୍ଯ୍ୟ ପୂଜା ସମାପ୍ତ ହୁଏ ।
ଏହାର ଠିକ୍ ପରେ ଭାଗବତ, ରାଧାକୃଷ୍ଣ, ଚନ୍ଦ୍ରଶେଖର, ବିଷ୍ଣୁ ଙ୍କୁ କିଛି ଖଇ, ଦହି ଓ କେଳି ପୂଜା କରାଯାଏ।
ଏହାପରେ ମା ଙ୍କର ବଲ୍ଲଭ ଭୋଗ ବସେ। ଏହି ସମୟ ରେ ଅରଗଳି ରେ ଥିବା ଦ୍ବାର କୁ ଅର୍ଦ୍ଧମୁଦ୍ରିତ କରାଯାଏ ଉକ୍ତ ଭୋଗ ରେ ଅଧିକ ପରିମାଣରେ ଖଇ, ଦହି ଓ କେଳି ଭୋଗ କରାଯାଏ। ପୂଜାପଣ୍ଡା ପଂଚୋପଚାର ରେ ଭୋଗ ସାରନ୍ତି।
ତାମ୍ବୁଳ ସେବା-
ବଲ୍ଲଭ ଭୋଗ ପରେ ମା ଙ୍କୁ ଦୁଇ ଖଣ୍ଡ ବିଡିଆ ପାନ ସମର୍ପଣ କରାଯାଏ। ଉକ୍ତ ବଲ୍ଲଭ ଭୋଗ ସକାଳ ପ୍ରାୟ ୯ ଘଟିକା ମଧ୍ୟରେ ସରିଥାଏ।
ସକାଳ ଧୂପ
ଦିନ ପ୍ରାୟ ୧୦ଟା ସମୟରେ ରୋଷରେ ପାକ ପ୍ରସ୍ତୁତ ହୋଇଯାଏ। ପ୍ରଥମେ ଜଗନ୍ନାଥଙ୍କ ପାଖରେ ଏକ ଥାଳି ଅନ୍ନ, ଡାଲି, ତରକାରୀ, ଭଜା ଭୋଗ କରାଯାଏ। ତାପରେ ଦେବୀ ଙ୍କର ସକାଳ ଧୂପ ବସେ। ଏଥିରେ ଅରୁଆ ଅନ୍ନ ଦୁଇ ଥାଳି, ଡାଲି, ତରକାରୀ ଓ ଭଜା ଭୋଗ ହୋଇଥାଏ। ପୂଜାପଣ୍ଡା ପଂଚୋପଚାର ରେ ଭୋଗ ସାରନ୍ତି । ପୂଜାପଣ୍ଡା ପରେ ଦୁଇ ଖଣ୍ଡ ବିଡିଆ ପାନ ସମର୍ପଣ କରନ୍ତି।
ଦେବୀ ଙ୍କର ପ୍ରତ୍ୟେକ ଧୂପର ଥାଳିରେ ପୂର୍ଣ୍ଣ ମାତ୍ରାରେ ଅନ୍ନ ବଢାଯାଇଥାଏ। କୌଣସି ଥାଳି ଅପୂର୍ଣ୍ଣ ଭାବରେ ବଢାଯିବା ନୀତି ବହିର୍ଭୂତ ଅଟେ। ପ୍ରତ୍ୟେକ ଥାଳିର ବ୍ୟାସ ପ୍ରାୟ ୧୪ ଇଞ୍ଚ ଅଟେ।ଭୋଗ ସଂମ୍ପୂର୍ଣ୍ଣ ସାତ୍ତ୍ଵିକ ଓ ଶୁଦ୍ଧ ଭାବରେ ପ୍ରସ୍ତୁତ ହୋଇଥାଏ। ସକାଳ ଧୂପର ଉପସଂହାରରେ ସପ୍ତମୁଖୀ ଦୀପରେ ସପ୍ତ ବଳିତାର ଆଳତି, ଘଣ୍ଟ, ଘଣ୍ଟା ଓ କାହାଳୀ ମାଧ୍ୟମରେ କରାଯାଏ।
ଅବକାଶ-
ସକାଳ ଧୂପର ଭୋଗ ଓ ଆଳତି ପରେ ପୂଜାପଣ୍ଡା ମା ଙ୍କ ଠାରେ ଆଲଟ ଓ ଚାମର ସେବା କରିଥାନ୍ତି। ଏହାକୁ ଅବକାଶ କୁହାଯାଏ।
ମନ୍ଦିର ମଧ୍ୟରେ ସକାଳ ଧୂପ ଚାଲିଥିବା ସମୟରେ ପାଚକ ଅନ୍ନ, ଡାଲି, ତରକାରୀ ଓ ଭଜା ପୃଥକ୍ ପୃଥକ୍ ଥାଳିରେ କାକଟେଇ ଓ ଗ୍ରାମେଶ୍ୱର ଙ୍କ ନିକଟରେ ଭୋଗ କରିଥାନ୍ତି।
ଦ୍ବିପ୍ରହର ଧୂପ
ଦିନ ପ୍ରାୟ ୧୨ ଟାରେ ଦ୍ବିପ୍ରହର ଧୂପ ହୋଇଥାଏ। ଏଥିରେ ଭୋଗ ହୁଏ ପୂର୍ବ ପରି ଅନ୍ନ ଦୁଇ ଥାଳି, ଡାଲି, ତରକାରୀ, ଭଜା ଓ କ୍ଷୀରି। ପୂଜାପଣ୍ଡା ପଂଚୋପଚାର ରେ ଭୋଗ ସାରନ୍ତି।
ଭୋଗ ଶେଷରେ ଦୁଇ ଖଣ୍ଡ ବିଡିଆ ପାନ ସମର୍ପଣ କରାଯାଏ। ଧୂପର ଉପସଂହାରରେ କର୍ପୂର ଆଳତି ହୁଏ। ଠିକ୍ ପରେ ପରେ ସପ୍ତମୁଖୀ ଦୀପରେ ଘଣ୍ଟ, ଘଣ୍ଟା, କାହାଳୀ ମାଧ୍ୟମରେ ଆଳତି କାର୍ଯ୍ଯ ହୋଇଥାଏ।
ଅବକାଶ
ଏହାପରେ ପୂଜାପଣ୍ଡା ଆଲଟ ଚାମର ସେବା କରିଥାନ୍ତି।
ଭଅଣ୍ଡ ଧୂପ
ଦିନ ପ୍ରାୟ ୨ ଟାରେ ଭଅଣ୍ଡ ଧୂପ ଭୋଗ ମଣ୍ଡପରେ କରାଯାଇଥାଏ। ମନ୍ଦିର ଓ ମୁଖଶାଳା ର ମିଶ୍ରିତ ସ୍ଥାନରେ ସାମାନ୍ଯ ଉଚ୍ଚ ଚଟାଣ ଭୋଗମଣ୍ଡପ ଅଟେ। କେବଳ ଏହି ଧୂପ ବ୍ୟତୀତ ଅନ୍ୟ ସମସ୍ତ ଧୂପ ସିଂହାସନ ଉପରେ କରାଯାଇଥାଏ। ପ୍ରତ୍ୟେକ ଧୂପ ସମୟରେ କବାଟ ବନ୍ଦ ରହେ। ଧୂପକାର୍ଯ୍ୟ ଶେଷ ହେବା ପର୍ଯ୍ୟନ୍ତ ମନ୍ଦିର ର ମଧ୍ଯକୁ ପ୍ରବେଶ କରିବା ଓ ଦେବୀ ଙ୍କୁ ଦର୍ଶନ କରିବା ସ୍ଥଗିତ ରଖାଯାଇଥାଏ। ଧୂପ ଶେଷ ହେଲେ ମନ୍ଦିର ଖୋଲେ, ଆଳତି ହୁଏ ଓ ଦର୍ଶନ ମିଳେ। ଦେବୀ ଙ୍କର ଏହି ଭୋଗ ରେ ଅନ୍ନ ୧ ଥାଳି, ଡାଲି, ତରକାରୀ, ଭଜା ଓ କ୍ଷୀରି ବଢାହୋଇଥାଏ ।
ଦିବାପହଡ ନୀତି
ଭଅଣ୍ଡ ଭୋଗ ପରେ ପୂଜାପଣ୍ଡା ଭିତର କବାଟ ଆଉଯାଇ ଭିତରେ ବିଧିପୂର୍ବକ ପହଡ ନୀତି କରନ୍ତି। ଏଥିରେ ପ୍ରଥମେ ମା'ଙ୍କ ନିକଟରେ 'ଖଡଉଁ ଲାଗି' ହୁଏ। ଅର୍ଥାତ୍ ଶଯ୍ୟାକୁ ଗମନ ନିମନ୍ତେ ମା'ଙ୍କ ପାଦ ତଳେ ଖଡଉଁ ସମର୍ପଣ କରାଯାଏ। 'ଖଟ ଶେଯଲାଗି ' ହୁଏ। ଅର୍ଥାତ୍ ମା' ଙ୍କ ଶୟନ ଖଟ ଉପରେ ଶେଯ ବିଚ୍ଛାଯାଇ ତା ଉପରେ ମାଣ୍ଡି ରଖାଯାଏ ଓ ଫୁଲ ସିଞ୍ଚି ଦିଆଯାଏ। ବିଶ୍ରାମ ଗ୍ରହଣ ନିମନ୍ତେ ପୂଜାପଣ୍ଡା ମା' ଙ୍କ ପାଦ ତଳେ ବିନମ୍ର ନିବେଦନ କରିଥାନ୍ତି। କିଛି ସମୟ 'ଆଲଟ ଚାମର ସେବା' କରି ମନ୍ଦିର ପରିତ୍ଯାଗ କରନ୍ତି। ଭିତର ଦ୍ବାର ବନ୍ଦ କରାଯାଏ। ଏହାକୁ 'ପହଡ ନୀତି' କୁହାଯାଏ। ପହଡ ପଡି ସାରିବା ପରେ ଅପରାହ୍ନ ରେ ନୀତିଗତ ଭାବେ ମନ୍ଦିର ଖୋଲିବା ପର୍ଯ୍ୟନ୍ତ ଭିତର ଦ୍ବାର ଖୋଲିବା ସମ୍ପୂର୍ଣ୍ଣ ଭାବରେ ନିଷିଦ୍ଧ ଥାଏ। କାରଣ ଏହା ଦ୍ବାରା ମା ଙ୍କର ବିଶ୍ରାମ ରେ ବ୍ୟାଘାତ ଘଟିଥାଏ।
ସଂନ୍ଧ୍ଯା ବେଶ
ସଂନ୍ଧ୍ଯାର ଅବ୍ୟବହିତ ପୂର୍ବରୁ ଉକ୍ତ ଦିବସର ଦ୍ବିତୀୟାର୍ଦ୍ଧରେ କାର୍ଯ୍ୟ ଆରମ୍ଭ କରାଯାଏ। ପୂଜାପଣ୍ଡା ସ୍ନାନ, ତର୍ପଣ ସାରି ଆସନ୍ତି। ବେଢା ମଧ୍ୟସ୍ଥ ରୋଷ ଅଗଣା ର କୂପ ମୂଳରେ ହସ୍ତ, ପାଦ, ମୁଖ ପ୍ରକ୍ଷାଳନ ପୂର୍ବକ ଶୁଦ୍ଧ ହୋଇ ମନ୍ଦିର ଖୋଲନ୍ତି। ମା ଙ୍କ ନିଦ୍ରା ଭଙ୍ଗ କରାନ୍ତି। ଖଟ ଶେଯ ଉଠାନ୍ତି। ନିର୍ମଳ ଶୁଦ୍ଧ ଜଳରେ ମା ଙ୍କର ମୁଖ ପ୍ରକ୍ଷାଳନ କରାନ୍ତି। ସକାଳେ ଲାଗି କରାଯାଇଥିବା ମାଳତକ କାଢି ୫ଖଣ୍ଡ ନୂତନ ମାଳ ଲାଗି କରନ୍ତି। ପୁନର୍ବାର ନୂତନ ଚନ୍ଦନ ଓ ସିନ୍ଦୂର ଲାଗି କରନ୍ତି।
ସଂନ୍ଧ୍ଯା ଆଳତି
ସଂନ୍ଧ୍ଯା ସମୟରେ ଘଣ୍ଟ, ଘଣ୍ଟା, କାହାଳୀ, ମହୁରୀ ବାଦନ ସହିତ ପ୍ରଥମେ କର୍ପୂର ଆଳତି କରାଯାଏ। ତା ପରେ ସପ୍ତମୁଖୀ ଦୀପରେ ଆଳତି କରାଯାଏ। ମା' ଙ୍କର ସଂନ୍ଧ୍ଯା ଆଳତି ଦର୍ଶନ କରିବା ପାଇଁ ବହୁ ଦର୍ଶକ ଉପସ୍ଥିତ ଥାନ୍ତି।
ଅବକାଶ
ସଂନ୍ଧ୍ଯା ଆଳତି ପରେ ପୂଜାପଣ୍ଡା ଆଲଟ ଚାମର ସେବା କରିଥାନ୍ତି।
ଏହାପରେ ପାର୍ଶ୍ୱଦେବତା ମାନଙ୍କ ଠାରେ ସଂନ୍ଧ୍ଯା ଆଳତି କରାଯାଏ। ରାଧାକୃଷ୍ଣ, ଚନ୍ଦ୍ରଶେଖର, ବିଷ୍ଣୁ ଓ ମା' ବଗଳା ଙ୍କୁ ୧ଗୋଟି ବଳିତାରେ, ଭାଗବତ ପୋଥି ଙ୍କୁ ୧ଗୋଟି ବଳିତାରେ, ଜଗନ୍ନାଥ ଙ୍କୁ ୧ଗୋଟି ବଳିତାରେ, କାକଟେଈଙ୍କୁ ପ୍ରଥମେ କର୍ପୂର ଆଳତି ଓ ପରେ ସପ୍ତବଳିତା ଯୁକ୍ତ ସପ୍ତମୁଖୀ ଦୀପରେ ଓ ପରିଶେଷରେ ଗ୍ରାମେଶ୍ୱର ଙ୍କୁ ୧ଗୋଟି ବଳିତାରେ ପୃଥକ୍ ପୃଥକ୍ ଭାବରେ ଘଣ୍ଟ, ଘଣ୍ଟା, କାହାଳୀ , ମହୁରୀ ବାଦନ ମଧ୍ୟରେ ଆଳତି କରାଯାଏ। ଏହିପରି ଭାବରେ ସଂନ୍ଧ୍ଯା ଆଳତି କାର୍ଯ୍ଯ ସମାପିତ ହୁଏ। ରାତ୍ରିଧୂପ ପାଇଁ ରୋଷରେ ପୁନର୍ବାର ନୂତନ ପାକ ପ୍ରସ୍ତୁତି କାର୍ଯ୍ୟ ଆରମ୍ଭ କରାଯାଏ।
ଭାଗବତ ପାଠ
ସଂନ୍ଧ୍ଯା ଆଳତି ପରେ ଓ ରାତ୍ରି ଧୂପ ଆରମ୍ଭ ପୂର୍ବରୁ ଜଗନ୍ନାଥ ଦାସଙ୍କ କୃତ 'ଭାଗବତ' ର ଅନ୍ୟୂନ ଗୋଟିଏ ଅଧ୍ୟାୟ ପ୍ରତି ଦିନ ମନ୍ଦିର ମଧ୍ୟରେ ପାଠ କରାଯାଏ।
ବଡସିଂହାର ଧୂପ
ପୂଜାପଣ୍ଡା ବଡସିଂହାର ଧୂପ ରେ ଛେନା, କଦଳୀ, ଚିନି, ମସଲା ମିଶ୍ରିତ ପଣା ଓ କେଳି ପଂଚୋପଚାରେ ଭୋଗ ସାରନ୍ତି ।
ତାମ୍ବୁଳ ସେବା
ଭୋଗ ପରେ ଦୁଇ ଖଣ୍ଡ ବିଡିଆ ପାନ ସମର୍ପଣ କରାଯାଏ।
ଏହାପରେ ବଡସିଂହାର ଆଳତି କରାଯାଏ। ପ୍ରଥମେ କର୍ପୂର ଆଳତି ଓ ପରେ ପରେ ସପ୍ତମୁଖୀ ଦୀପରେ ଆଳତି ହୁଏ। ଉକ୍ତ ବଡସିଂହାର ଆଳତି ସମୟରେ କୌଣସି ଘଣ୍ଟ ବାଜେ ନାହିଁ। କେବଳ ମାତ୍ର ମୃଦୁ ଘଣ୍ଟି ଓ କାହାଳୀ ବାଦନ କରାଯାଏ। ଆଳତି ସମୟରେ ଜଗମୋହନ ରେ ଆନନ୍ଦ ଲହରୀ କିମ୍ବା ଦେବୀ ଙ୍କର କୌଣସି ସ୍ତବ ଗାନ କରାଯାଏ। ଆଳତି ପରେ ମା'ଙ୍କ ଦେହରୁ ଖଣ୍ଡିଏ ପ୍ରସାଦ ମାଳ ନିଆଯାଇ ବାହନ ସିଂହଙ୍କ ଗଳାରେ ଦିଆଯାଏ। ବଡସିଂହାର ରେ ପୂଜା ହୋଇଥିବା କେଳି ଓ ପଣା ଭୋଗକୁ ସିଂହଙ୍କୁ ସମର୍ପଣ କରାଯାଏ। ବଡସିଂହାର ରେ ଆଳତି କରାଯାଇଥିବା ଛଡା ସପ୍ତମୁଖୀ ଦୀପରେ ସିଂହଙ୍କୁ ଆଳତି କରାଯାଏ।
ଅବକାଶ
ସିଂହସେବା ପରେ ପୂଜାପଣ୍ଡା ମା'ଙ୍କର ଆଲଟ ଓ ଚାମର ସେବା କରିଥାନ୍ତି।
ରାତ୍ରି ଧୂପ
ରାତି ପ୍ରାୟ ୯ଟାରୁ ୧୦ଟା ମଧ୍ୟରେ ରାତ୍ରିଧୂପ ବସିଥାଏ। ଏଥିରେ ଭୋଗ ହୁଏ ଅନ୍ନ ଦୁଇ ଥାଳି, ଡାଲି, ତରକାରୀ, ଭଜା, କ୍ଷୀରି, ଦହି ପଖାଳ ଓ କାକରା ୪୦ଗୋଟି। ପୂର୍ବାହ୍ନ ର ଧୂପ ମାନଙ୍କ ଠାରୁ ଅପରାହ୍ନର ଧୂପରେ ଅଧିକ ଭୋଗ ସାମଗ୍ରୀ ଭାବରେ ଥାଏ ଦହି ପଖାଳ ଓ କାକରା।
ତାମ୍ବୁଳ ସେବା
ଭୋଗ ପରେ ଦୁଇ ଖଣ୍ଡ ବିଡିଆ ପାନ ସମର୍ପଣ କରାଯାଏ। ଧୂପର ଉପସଂହାରରେ ଘଣ୍ଟ, ଘଣ୍ଟା, କାହାଳୀ ବାଦନ ମାଧ୍ୟମରେ ପ୍ରଥମେ କର୍ପୂର ଆଳତି ଓ ତାପରେ ସପ୍ତମୁଖୀ ଦୀପରେ ଆଳତି କରାଯାଏ।
ଅବକାଶ
ଆଳତି ପରେ ପୂଜାପଣ୍ଡା ଆଲଟ ଓ ଚାମର ସେବା କରିଥାନ୍ତି। ଉକ୍ତ ସମୟରେ ଜଗମୋହନ ରେ ଘଣ୍ଟିର ମୃଦୁ ବାଦନ ସହିତ ଜୟଦେବ ଙ୍କ କୃତ 'ଗୀତଗୋବିନ୍ଦ' ପାଠ କରାଯାଏ।
ମନ୍ଦିର ମଧ୍ୟରେ ପୂଜାପଣ୍ଡା ଙ୍କ ଦ୍ଵାରା ରାତ୍ରି ଧୂପ ଚାଲିଥିବା ସମୟରେ ପାଚକ ପାର୍ଶ୍ୱଦେବତା ମାନଙ୍କୁ ରାତ୍ରି ଭୋଗ କରାଇଥାନ୍ତି। ପ୍ରଥମେ ଜଗନ୍ନାଥଙ୍କୁ ଏକ ଥାଳିରେ ପାକ ପ୍ରସ୍ତୁତ ସମସ୍ତ ସଙ୍କୋଡି ଭୋଗ ପୂଜା କରାନ୍ତି। ତାପରେ ଠିକ୍ ଏହିପରି ଭୋଗ କାକଟେଈଙ୍କୁ ପୂଜା କରାନ୍ତି। ଗ୍ରାମେଶ୍ୱର ମହାଦେବଙ୍କୁ ଦହି ପଖାଳ ଓ କାକରା ଭୋଗ କରାନ୍ତି। ଭାଗବତଙ୍କୁ କେବଳ କାକରା ଭୋଗ କରାନ୍ତି। ରାଧାକୃଷ୍ଣ, ଚନ୍ଦ୍ରଶେଖର, ବିଷ୍ଣୁ ପ୍ରତିମା ଓ ମା' ବଗଳା ଙ୍କୁ କେବଳ କାକରା ଭୋଗ କରାଇଥାନ୍ତି।
ବଡସିଂହାର ଧୂପ ପରେ ପହଡ ନୀତି ଆରମ୍ଭ ହୁଏ। ପୂର୍ବାହ୍ନ ପରି ଦ୍ବାର ଆଉଯାଇ ପୂଜାପଣ୍ଡା ପ୍ରଥମେ ମା'ଙ୍କ ନିକଟରେ ଖଡମଲାଗି କରନ୍ତି। ତାପରେ ଖଟଶେଯ ଲାଗି କରନ୍ତି। ପରିଶେଷରେ ପହଡ ପଡେ। ପୂଜକ ମା'ଙ୍କୁ ପ୍ରଣାମ ଜଣାଇ ମନ୍ଦିର ପରିତ୍ଯାଗ କରନ୍ତି। ଭିତର ଦ୍ବାର ବନ୍ଦ ହୁଏ।
ଏହିପରି ଦିନମାନ ର ନୀତି କରାଯାଇ ଥାଏ।

Festivals

ଚୈତ୍ର ପ୍ରଥମ ମଙ୍ଗଳବାର (ମା ମଙ୍ଗଳା ଙ୍କ ପ୍ରଥମ ପାଳି ଯାତ୍ରା) || ମା ମଙ୍ଗଳା ଙ୍କ ପାଣିତୋଳା ଓ ପାଟୁଆନୃତ୍ୟ
ଚୈତ୍ର ପ୍ରଥମ ମଙ୍ଗଳବାର (ପ୍ରଥମ ପାଳି ଯାତ୍ରା)
ସ୍ମାର୍ତ୍ତେକର୍ମଣି କେ ରତାଃ କ୍ଷିତିତଳେ କେ ବୈଷ୍ଣବୀ କର୍ମଣି
ପ୍ରାୟାକେଚନ କୌଳଧର୍ମ ନିରତାଃ କେ ଯୋଗମାର୍ଗେସ୍ଥି ତାଃ
କେବା ଶୈବମତେ ମତେ ଗଣପତେ ସୌରମତେ କେ ସ୍ଥିତା
କେଷାଂ ନୈବଗତି ତ୍ୱଦୀୟ କରୁଣା ମାତବିର୍ନା ଚଣ୍ଡିକେ।।
ରାତ୍ର ତିନିଘଡି ଥାଇ ମନ୍ଦିର ଦ୍ବାରଫିଟା ପରେ ମଙ୍ଗଳ ଆଳତି, ଭିତର ଶୋଧ, ସ୍ନାନ, ବେଶ, ଚନ୍ଦନ ଲାଗି ପରେ ସୂର୍ଯ୍ୟପୂଜା, ବଲ୍ଲଭ ନୀତି କରାଯାଏ। ବଲ୍ଲଭ ନୀତି ପରେ ପ୍ରାରମ୍ଭିକ ସମୟରେ ସକାଳ ଧୂପ କରାଯାଏ ଏବଂ ବନ୍ଦାପନା ଆଳତୀ ପରେ ସର୍ବସାଧାରଣ ଦର୍ଶନ ପାଇଁ ସାହାଣମେଲା କରାଦିଆଯାଏ। ଏବଂ ମା ଙ୍କର ଦିବ୍ୟ ବେଶ ଦର୍ଶନ କରିବା ସହ ସୀମନ୍ତିନୀ ଗଣ ମନ୍ଦିର ବେଢାରେ ପନ୍ଥେଇ ପୂଜା କରିଥାନ୍ତି।
ପ୍ରାୟତଃ ମଧ୍ୟାହ୍ନ ରେ ନେତ ଉତ୍ସବ ଅନୁଷ୍ଠିତ ହୁଏ। ପରେ ଶାରଳା ପୀଠ ରୁ ଆସିଥିବା ରାଉଳ ସେବକ ମାନେ ଓ ଭୋଇ ସେବକ ମାନେ ପାଣିତୋଳି ମନ୍ଦିର ବେଢା ରେ ପାଟୁଆ ନୃତ୍ୟ କରିଥାନ୍ତି । ଏହାପରେ ମନ୍ଦିର ଗର୍ଭଗୃହ ଖାଲି କରାଯାଇ ଦ୍ବିପ୍ରହର ଧୂପ ଓ ଭଅଣ୍ଡ ଧୂପ କରାଯାଏ ଏବଂ ଦ୍ବିପ୍ରହର ପହୁଡ ପଡେ। ସଂନ୍ଧ୍ଯା ଆଳତି କରାଯାଇ ଉଲାଗି ଓ ମାର୍ଜନା କରାଯାଏ। ବେଶ ପରେ ଭାଗବତ ପାଠ, ରାତ୍ରି ଧୂପ, ଗୀତଗୋବିନ୍ଦ ପାଠ ଓ ବଡସିଂହାର ପରେ ଭ୍ରମଣ ନୀତି ଅନୁଷ୍ଠିତ ହୋଇଥାଏ।
ଭ୍ରମଣୀ ନୀତି ଚୈତ୍ର ମାସର ଚାରି ମଙ୍ଗଳବାର, ଝାମୁପାଳି, ଓ ଆଶ୍ଵିନ ମାସର ଶୁକ୍ଳପକ୍ଷ ଦ୍ଵିତୀୟା ଠାରୁ ସପ୍ତମୀ ପର୍ଯ୍ୟନ୍ତ ଛଅଦିନ ପାଳିତ ହୋଇଥାଏ। ଉକ୍ତ ଦିନ ମାନଙ୍କରେ ମା' ଙ୍କର ବଡସିଂହାର ଧୂପ ସରିବା ପରେ ମା' ଙ୍କର ଚଳନ୍ତି ପ୍ରତିମା ଓ ଦୁର୍ଗା ପ୍ରତିମା ଙ୍କୁ ଗୋଟିଏ ପାଲିଙ୍କି ରେ ରଖି ମା' ଙ୍କର ମନ୍ଦିର ର ବେଢା କୁ ତିନି ଥର ପରିକ୍ରମା କରାଯାଇଥାଏ। ଏହାପରେ ମନ୍ଦିର କୁ ଫେରାଇ ନିଆଯାଇ ସିଂହାସନ ଉପରେ 'ଭ୍ରମଣୀ ଭୋଗ' ନାମରେ ଏକ ବାଲ୍ୟ ଭୋଗ ଅର୍ପଣ କରାଯାଇଥାଏ। ଏହାପରେ ମା' ଙ୍କର ପହଡ ପଡିଥାଏ।
ପାଣିତୋଳା ଓ ପାଟୁଆନୃତ୍ୟ
ଚୈତ୍ରମାସର ପ୍ରଥମ ପାଳି ମଙ୍ଗଳବାର ରୁ ଆରମ୍ଭ କରି ପଞ୍ଚମ ମଙ୍ଗଳବାର ପର୍ଯ୍ୟନ୍ତ ପରମ୍ପରାଗତ ଭାବେ ଘଟତୋଳା ତୁଠରେ ପାଣିତୋଳା ଓ ପାଟୁକାନୃତ୍ୟ ଅନୁଷ୍ଠିତ ହୁଏ।
ପ୍ରତି ପାଳିଯାତ୍ରାରେ ମା'ଙ୍କର ସକାଳଧୂପ ପରେ ପ୍ରାୟତଃ ମଧ୍ୟାହ୍ନ ସମୟରେ ଝଙ୍କଡ ଶାରଳା ପୀଠରୁ ଆସିଥିବା ରାଉଳ(ମାଳି) ସେବକମାନେ ନିଜକୁ ପାଟୁକା ବେଶରେ ସଜାଇଥାନ୍ତି। ଦେହରେ ଶାଢୀ, ମଥାରେ ଓଢଣୀ ଓ ମା' ଙ୍କ ସିନ୍ଦୂର, ବାହୁରେ ବାଜୁବନ୍ଧ, ହାତରେ ମୁଠାଚୁଡି ଏବଂ ଗଳାରେ ମନ୍ଦାର ମାଳ ପରିଧାନ କରନ୍ତି।
ପରେ ଏକ କାଷ୍ଠ ଦଣ୍ଡ ସହ ମନ୍ଦାର, କନିଅର ଓ ଅରଖ ଫୁଲରେ ସଜାହୋଇଥିବା ଏକ ପଞ୍ଚମୁଖୀ କଳସ ଧରି ଘଣ୍ଟ, ଘଣ୍ଟା ବାଦ୍ୟ ମାଧ୍ୟମରେ ପ୍ରାଚୀ ନଦୀର ଘଣ୍ଟତୋଳା ତୁଠକୁ ବିଜେ କରନ୍ତି। ଏହି ପାଞ୍ଚ ଜଣ ମାଳି ପାଟୁଆ ଙ୍କ ସହ ଥାନ୍ତି ପାଞ୍ଚ ଜଣ ଭୋଇ ପାଟୁଆ। ଘଣ୍ଟତୋଳା ତୁଠରେ ପାଟୁଆ ମାନେ ନିଜ ଘଣ୍ଟରେ ପାଣି ତୋଳି ସୂର୍ଯ୍ୟ ଦେବତାଙ୍କୁ ସାକ୍ଷୀ ରଖି ପାଣି ଅଭିମନ୍ତ୍ରିତ କରି ଘଟ ସ୍ଥାପନ କରନ୍ତି। ପରେ ଘଟକୁ ମୁଣ୍ଡାଇ ଘଣ୍ଟ ବଜାଇ ମନ୍ଦିରକୁ ଫେରନ୍ତି। ଫେରିବା ବାଟରେ ଗ୍ରାମଦେବତୀ କାକଟେଈଙ୍କୁ ଘଟରୁ ପୁଷ୍ପାଞ୍ଜଳି ପ୍ରଦାନ କରନ୍ତି।
ମାଳି ପାଟୁଆ ମାନେ ପୂର୍ବ ଦ୍ବାର ଦେଇ ଗର୍ଭଗୃହ କୁ ପ୍ରବେଶ କରନ୍ତି। ସେଠାରେ ପୂଜାପଣ୍ଡା ସେମାନଙ୍କୁ ଆଜ୍ଞାମାଳ ପ୍ରଦାନ କରନ୍ତି। ଆଜ୍ଞାମାଳ ପାଇବା ପରେ ସେମାନେ ମନ୍ଦିର ବେଢ଼ାରେ ଓ ଭୋଇ ପାଟୁଆ ବେଢା ବାହାରେ ପାଟୁଆନୃତ୍ୟ କରନ୍ତି। ଏହିପରି ପାଟୁକା ନୃତ୍ଯ ମଙ୍ଗଳା ମନ୍ଦିରରେ ଅନନ୍ୟ |

ଚକ୍ର ମାଜଣା ଓ ନେତ୍ରୋତ୍ସବ

ଚୈତ୍ର ମାସ ପ୍ରଥମ ପାଳି ମଙ୍ଗଳବାର ଦିନ ମା'ଙ୍କର ସକାଳଧୂପ ପରେ ପାଟୁକା ନାଚ ପୂର୍ବରୁ ପ୍ରାୟତଃ ମଧ୍ୟାହ୍ନ ସମୟରେ ପାଳିଆ ପୂଜାପଣ୍ଡା ଏକ ପିତ୍ତଳ ଥାଳିରେ ନୂତନ ନେତ ଓ ଚକ୍ର ମାଜଣା ସାମଗ୍ରୀ ଧରି ମନ୍ଦିର କୁ ତିନିଥର ବେଢା ପରିକ୍ରମା କରିଥାନ୍ତି। ଘଣ୍ଟ, କାହାଳୀ, ମୃଦଙ୍ଗ, ଗୋପାଳମାନଙ୍କ ଲଉଡ଼ି ଖେଳ ଓ କାଳିଶୀ ମାନଙ୍କ ନୃତ୍ଯ ମନ୍ଦିର ବେଢ଼ାକୁ ଭାବମୟ ପରିବେଶରେ ରୂପାନ୍ତରିତ କରେ।

ଉକ୍ତ ଶୁକ୍ଳ ନେତଟିକୁ କଟକ ଜିଲ୍ଲାର ତଣ୍ଡଉଣି ଗ୍ରାମର ଜନୈକ ମହାରଣା ପରିବାର ମନ୍ଦିରକୁ ଦେଇଥାନ୍ତି। ଏଥିପାଇଁ ମଧ୍ଯ ସେ ମନ୍ଦିରରୁ ଶିରପା ପାଇଥାନ୍ତି।

ପୂଜାପଣ୍ଡା ବେଢା କରିସାରିବା ପରେ ଅନ୍ଯ ସେବାୟତମାନଙ୍କ ହସ୍ତରେ ନେତ କୁ ଦେଇ ସିଂହାସନକୁ ଯାଇଥାନ୍ତି। ସେବାୟତ ମାନେ ମନ୍ଦିର ଉପରକୁ ଚଢି ପ୍ରଥମେ ଚୁଆ, ହଳଦୀ ଆଦିରେ ଚକ୍ରକୁ ମାଜଣା କରନ୍ତି ଏବଂ ନୂତନ ନେତ କୁ ବାନ୍ଧିଦିଅନ୍ତି ମଙ୍ଗଳମୟୀ ଙ୍କ ନିକଟରେ ଜଗତର ମଙ୍ଗଳ କାମନା କରି।

ପ୍ରମାଣ:- ମା'ଙ୍କ ଉକ୍ତ ମନ୍ଦିର ର ନିର୍ମାଣ କାର୍ଯ୍ଯ ସମାପ୍ତ ପରେ ଠିକ୍ ଏହି ଦିନ ହିଁ ପ୍ରତିଷ୍ଠା କରାଯାଇ ନେତ ବନ୍ଧାଯାଇଥିଲା। ତେଣୁ ପ୍ରଥମ ପାଳିଯାତ୍ରାରେ ନେତ୍ରୋତ୍ସବ ପରମ୍ପରା ମଙ୍ଗଳା ମନ୍ଦିରରେ ଅନନ୍ୟ।

ଚୈତ୍ର ଦ୍ବିତୀୟ ମଙ୍ଗଳବାର (ଦ୍ବିତୀୟ ପାଳି ଯାତ୍ରା)
ଚୈତ୍ର ଦ୍ବିତୀୟ ମଙ୍ଗଳବାର (ଦ୍ବିତୀୟ ପାଳି ଯାତ୍ରା)
ରାତ୍ର ତିନିଘଡି ଥାଇ ମନ୍ଦିର ଦ୍ବାରଫିଟା ପରେ ମଙ୍ଗଳ ଆଳତି, ଭିତର ଶୋଧ, ସ୍ନାନ, ବେଶ, ଚନ୍ଦନ ଲାଗି ପରେ ସୂର୍ଯ୍ୟପୂଜା, ବଲ୍ଲଭ ନୀତି କରାଯାଏ। ବଲ୍ଲଭ ନୀତି ପରେ ପ୍ରାରମ୍ଭିକ ସମୟରେ ସକାଳ ଧୂପ କରାଯାଏ ଏବଂ ବନ୍ଦାପନା ଆଳତୀ ପରେ ସର୍ବସାଧାରଣ ଦର୍ଶନ ପାଇଁ ସାହାଣମେଲା କରାଦିଆଯାଏ। ଏବଂ ମା ଙ୍କର ରାଜରାଜେଶ୍ଵରୀ ବେଶ ଦର୍ଶନ କରିବା ସହ ବେଢାରେ ସୀମନ୍ତିନୀ ଗଣ ଙ୍କ ଦ୍ଵାରା ମନ୍ଦିର ବେଢାରେ ପନ୍ଥେଇ ପୂଜା କରିଥାନ୍ତି।
ପ୍ରାୟତଃ ମଧ୍ୟାହ୍ନ ସମୟ ରେ ଶାରଳା ପୀଠ ରୁ ଆସିଥିବା ରାଉଳ ସେବକ ମାନେ ଓ ଭୋଇ ସେବକ ମାନେ ମା' ଙ୍କର ଆଜ୍ଞାମାଳ ପାଇବା ପର ଘଣ୍ଟ, ଢୋଲ ଓ କାହାଳୀ ମଧ୍ଯରେ ପ୍ରାଚୀ ନଦୀ ର ଘଟତୋଳା ତୁଠ କୁ ଗମନ କରି ସେଠାରେ ପଞ୍ଚମୁଖୀ ଘାଟିରେ ପ୍ରାଚୀ ରୁ ପାଣି ତୋଳି ସାରି ମନ୍ଦିର କୁ ଫେରନ୍ତି। ଘଣ୍ଟ ପାଟୁଆ ସେବକ ମାନେ ନିଜକୁ ନାରୀ ବେଶରେ ସଜାଇ ହୋଇଥାନ୍ତି। ମନ୍ଦିର ଫେରିବା ପରେ ଘଣ୍ଟ ପାଟୁଆ ନୃତ୍ୟ କରିଥାନ୍ତି। ପାଟୁଆ ନୃତ୍ୟ ସମାପନ ହୁଏ।
ଏହାପରେ ମନ୍ଦିର ଗର୍ଭଗୃହ ଖାଲି କରାଯାଇ ଦ୍ବିପ୍ରହର ଧୂପ ଓ ଭଅଣ୍ଡ ଧୂପ କରାଯାଏ ଏବଂ ଦ୍ବିପ୍ରହର ପହୁଡ ପଡେ। ସଂନ୍ଧ୍ଯା ଆଳତି କରାଯାଇ ଉଲାଗି ଓ ମାର୍ଜନା କରାଯାଏ। ବେଶ ପରେ ଭାଗବତ ପାଠ, ରାତ୍ରି ଧୂପ, ଗୀତଗୋବିନ୍ଦ ପାଠ ଓ ବଡସିଂହାର ପରେ ଭ୍ରମଣୀ ନୀତି ଅନୁଷ୍ଠିତ ହୋଇଥାଏ।
ଏହାପରେ ମନ୍ଦିର କୁ ଫେରାଇ ନିଆଯାଇ ସିଂହାସନ ଉପରେ 'ଭ୍ରମଣୀ ଭୋଗ' ନାମରେ ଏକ ବାଲ୍ୟ ଭୋଗ ଅର୍ପଣ କରାଯାଇଥାଏ। ଏହାପରେ ମା' ଙ୍କର ପହଡ ପଡିଥାଏ।

ଚୈତ୍ର ତୃତୀୟ ମଙ୍ଗଳବାର (ତୃତୀୟ ପାଳି ଯାତ୍ରା)

ରାତ୍ର ତିନିଘଡି ଥାଇ ମନ୍ଦିର ଦ୍ବାରଫିଟା ପରେ ମଙ୍ଗଳ ଆଳତି, ଭିତର ଶୋଧ, ସ୍ନାନ, ବେଶ, ଚନ୍ଦନ ଲାଗି ପରେ ସୂର୍ଯ୍ୟପୂଜା, ବଲ୍ଲଭ ନୀତି କରାଯାଏ। ବଲ୍ଲଭ ନୀତି ପରେ ପ୍ରାରମ୍ଭିକ ସମୟରେ ସକାଳ ଧୂପ କରାଯାଏ ଏବଂ ବନ୍ଦାପନା ଆଳତୀ ପରେ ସର୍ବସାଧାରଣ ଦର୍ଶନ ପାଇଁ ସାହାଣମେଲା କରାଦିଆଯାଏ। ଏବଂ ମା ଙ୍କର ରାଜରାଜେଶ୍ଵରୀ ବେଶ ଦର୍ଶନ କରିବା ସହ ସୀମନ୍ତିନୀ ଗଣ ମନ୍ଦିର ବେଢାରେ ପନ୍ଥେଇ ପୂଜା କରିଥାନ୍ତି।

ପ୍ରାୟତଃ ମଧ୍ୟାହ୍ନ ସମୟରେ ଶାରଳା ପୀଠ ରୁ ଆସିଥିବା ରାଉଳ ସେବକ ମାନେ ଓ ଭୋଇ ସେବକ ମାନେ ମା' ଙ୍କର ଆଜ୍ଞାମାଳ ପାଇବା ପର ଘଣ୍ଟ, ଢୋଲ ଓ କାହାଳୀ ମଧ୍ଯରେ ପ୍ରାଚୀ ନଦୀ ର ଘରତୋଳା ତୁଠ କୁ ଗମନ କରି ସେଠାରେ ପଞ୍ଚମୁଖୀ ଘାଟିରେ ପ୍ରାଚୀ ରୁ ପାଣି ତୋଳି ସାରି ମନ୍ଦିର କୁ ଫେରନ୍ତି। ଘଣ୍ଟ ପାଟୁଆ ସେବକ ମାନେ ନିଜକୁ ନାରୀ ବେଶରେ ସଜାଇ ହୋଇଥାନ୍ତି। ମନ୍ଦିର ଫେରିବା ପରେ ଘଣ୍ଟ ପାଟୁଆ ନୃତ୍ୟ କରିଥାନ୍ତି। ପାଟୁଆ ନୃତ୍ୟ ସମାପନ ହୁଏ।
ଏହାପରେ ମନ୍ଦିର ଗର୍ଭଗୃହ ଖାଲି କରାଯାଇ ଦ୍ବିପ୍ରହର ଧୂପ ଓ ଭଅଣ୍ଡ ଧୂପ କରାଯାଏ ଏବଂ ଦ୍ବିପ୍ରହର ପହୁଡ ପଡେ। ସଂନ୍ଧ୍ଯା ଆଳତି କରାଯାଇ ଉଲାଗି ଓ ମାର୍ଜନା କରାଯାଏ। ବେଶ ପରେ ଭାଗବତ ପାଠ ହୁଏ ।

ପ୍ରାୟତଃ ମଧ୍ଯରାତ୍ରି ସମୟରେ କାଳିକା ନୃତ୍ୟ ଅନୁଷ୍ଠିତ ହୋଇଥାଏ। ଏକ ନିର୍ଦ୍ଦିଷ୍ଟ ଖମାରେଇ ପରିବାର ଏଥିପାଇଁ ଉଦ୍ଦିଷ୍ଟ। ନିର୍ଦ୍ଦିଷ୍ଟ ବ୍ୟକ୍ତି ଦିନସାରା ଉପବାସ କରିଥାଏ। ରାତ୍ରି ପ୍ରାୟ ୧୧ ଟାରେ ଦେବୀ ଙ୍କର ପୂର୍ବତନ ଗୋଶାଳା ରେ ମହାକାଳୀ ବେଶରେ ସଜ୍ଜିତ ହୋଇ ଖଡ୍ଗ ଧାରଣ ପୂର୍ବକ ଘଣ୍ଟ, ଢୋଲ, ମହୁରୀ, ମଶାଲ ମଧ୍ୟରେ ମା ଙ୍କ ମନ୍ଦିର ଅଭିମୁଖେ ନାଚି ନାଚି ଯାତ୍ରା କରେ। ଏକଥର ବେଢା ପରିକ୍ରମା କରି ମନ୍ଦିର ମଧ୍ଯକୁ ପ୍ରବେଶ କରେ। ମା ଙ୍କର ସଂନ୍ଧ୍ଯା ଆଳତି ର ପରବର୍ତ୍ତୀ ବେଶକୁ ଦର୍ଶନ କରି ଦକ୍ଷିଣ ଦ୍ବାର ଦେଇ ନିର୍ଗତ ହୁଏ। ନାନା ବାଦ୍ୟ ମଧ୍ୟରେ ଓ ଦର୍ଶକ ମାନଙ୍କ ଦ୍ଵାରା ବେଷ୍ଟିତ ହୋଇ ଏହି ତୃତୀୟ ପାଳିରେ ତିନି ଥର ବେଢା ପରିକ୍ରମା କରି କାକଟେଇଙ୍କ ମନ୍ଦିରକୁ ତିନି ଥର ପରିକ୍ରମା କରି ଦେବୀ ଙ୍କ ପୂର୍ବତନ ଗୋଶାଳା ଅଭିମୁଖେ ନାଚି ନାଚି ଚାଲିଥାଏ। ଗୋଶାଳା ନିକଟରେ ନିସ୍ତେଜ ହୋଇ ପତିତ ହୁଏ ଓ କାଳିକା ନାଚ ର ସମାପ୍ତି ଘଟିଥାଏ।

ରାତ୍ରି ଧୂପ, ଗୀତଗୋବିନ୍ଦ ପାଠ ଓ ବଡସିଂହାର ପରେ ଭ୍ରମଣୀ ନୀତି ଅନୁଷ୍ଠିତ ହୋଇଥାଏ।ମା' ଙ୍କର ବଡସିଂହାର ଧୂପ ସରିବା ପରେ ମା' ଙ୍କର ଚଳନ୍ତି ପ୍ରତିମା ଓ ଦୁର୍ଗା ପ୍ରତିମା ଙ୍କୁ ଗୋଟିଏ ଆସନରେ ରଖି ମା' ଙ୍କର ମନ୍ଦିର ର ବେଢା କୁ ତିନି ଥର ପରିକ୍ରମା କରାଯାଇଥାଏ। ଏହାପରେ ମନ୍ଦିର କୁ ଫେରାଇ ନିଆଯାଇ ସିଂହାସନ ଉପରେ 'ଭ୍ରମଣୀ ଭୋଗ' ନାମରେ ଏକ ବାଲ୍ୟ ଭୋଗ ଅର୍ପଣ କରାଯାଇଥାଏ। ଏହାପରେ ମା' ଙ୍କର ପହଡ ପଡିଥାଏ।

ଚୈତ୍ର ଚତୁର୍ଥ ମଙ୍ଗଳବାର (ଚତୁର୍ଥ ପାଳି ଯାତ୍ରା)

ରାତ୍ର ତିନିଘଡି ଥାଇ ମନ୍ଦିର ଦ୍ବାରଫିଟା ପରେ ମଙ୍ଗଳ ଆଳତି, ଭିତର ଶୋଧ, ସ୍ନାନ, ବେଶ, ଚନ୍ଦନ ଲାଗି ପରେ ସୂର୍ଯ୍ୟପୂଜା, ବଲ୍ଲଭ ନୀତି କରାଯାଏ। ବଲ୍ଲଭ ନୀତି ପରେ ପ୍ରାରମ୍ଭିକ ସମୟରେ ସକାଳ ଧୂପ କରାଯାଏ ଏବଂ ବନ୍ଦାପନା ଆଳତୀ ପରେ ସର୍ବସାଧାରଣ ଦର୍ଶନ ପାଇଁ ସାହାଣମେଲା କରାଦିଆଯାଏ। ଏବଂ ମା ଙ୍କର ରାଜରାଜେଶ୍ଵରୀ ବେଶ ଦର୍ଶନ କରିବା ସହ ସୀମନ୍ତିନୀ ଗଣ ମନ୍ଦିର ବେଢାରେ ପନ୍ଥେଇ ପୂଜା କରିଥାନ୍ତି।

ପ୍ରାୟତଃ ମଧ୍ୟାହ୍ନ ସମୟରେ ଶାରଳା ପୀଠ ରୁ ଆସିଥିବା ରାଉଳ ସେବକ ମାନେ ଓ ଭୋଇ ସେବକ ମାନେ ମା' ଙ୍କର ଆଜ୍ଞାମାଳ ପାଇବା ପର ଘଣ୍ଟ, ଢୋଲ ଓ କାହାଳୀ ମଧ୍ଯରେ ପ୍ରାଚୀ ନଦୀ ର ଘରତୋଳା ତୁଠ କୁ ଗମନ କରି ସେଠାରେ ପଞ୍ଚମୁଖୀ ଘଟରେ ପ୍ରାଚୀ ରୁ ପାଣି ତୋଳି ସାରି ମନ୍ଦିର କୁ ଫେରନ୍ତି। ଘଣ୍ଟ ପାଟୁଆ ସେବକ ମାନେ ନିଜକୁ ନାରୀ ବେଶରେ ସଜାଇ ହୋଇଥାନ୍ତି। ମନ୍ଦିର ଫେରିବା ପରେ ଘଣ୍ଟ ପାଟୁଆ ନୃତ୍ୟ କରିଥାନ୍ତି। ପାଟୁଆ ନୃତ୍ୟ ସମାପନ ହୁଏ।
ଏହାପରେ ମନ୍ଦିର ଗର୍ଭଗୃହ ଖାଲି କରାଯାଇ ଦ୍ବିପ୍ରହର ଧୂପ ଓ ଭଅଣ୍ଡ ଧୂପ କରାଯାଏ ଏବଂ ଦ୍ବିପ୍ରହର ପହୁଡ ପଡେ। ସଂନ୍ଧ୍ଯା ଆଳତି କରାଯାଇ ଉଲାଗି ଓ ମାର୍ଜନା କରାଯାଏ। ବେଶ ପରେ ଭାଗବତ ପାଠ ହୁଏ ।

ପ୍ରାୟତଃ ମଧ୍ଯରାତ୍ରି ସମୟରେ କାଳିକା ନୃତ୍ୟ ଅନୁଷ୍ଠିତ ହୋଇଥାଏ। ଏକ ନିର୍ଦ୍ଦିଷ୍ଟ ଖମାରେଇ ପରିବାର ଏଥିପାଇଁ ଉଦ୍ଦିଷ୍ଟ। ନିର୍ଦ୍ଦିଷ୍ଟ ବ୍ୟକ୍ତି ଦିନସାରା ଉପବାସ କରିଥାଏ। ରାତ୍ରି ପ୍ରାୟ ୧୧ ଟାରେ ଦେବୀ ଙ୍କର ପୂର୍ବତନ ଗୋଶାଳା ରେ ମହାକାଳୀ ବେଶରେ ସଜ୍ଜିତ ହୋଇ ଖଡ୍ଗ ଧାରଣ ପୂର୍ବକ ଘଣ୍ଟ, ଢୋଲ, ମହୁରୀ, ମଶାଲ ମଧ୍ୟରେ ମା ଙ୍କ ମନ୍ଦିର ଅଭିମୁଖେ ନାଚି ନାଚି ଯାତ୍ରା କରେ। ଏକଥର ବେଢା ପରିକ୍ରମା କରି ମନ୍ଦିର ମଧ୍ଯକୁ ପ୍ରବେଶ କରେ। ମା ଙ୍କର ସଂନ୍ଧ୍ଯା ଆଳତି ର ପରବର୍ତ୍ତୀ ବେଶକୁ ଦର୍ଶନ କରି ଦକ୍ଷିଣ ଦ୍ବାର ଦେଇ ନିର୍ଗତ ହୁଏ। ନାନା ବାଦ୍ୟ ମଧ୍ୟରେ ଓ ଦର୍ଶକ ମାନଙ୍କ ଦ୍ଵାରା ବେଷ୍ଟିତ ହୋଇ ଏହି ଚତୁର୍ଥ ପାଳିରେ ଚାରି ଥର ବେଢା ପରିକ୍ରମା କରି କାକଟେଇଙ୍କ ମନ୍ଦିରକୁ ତିନି ଥର ପରିକ୍ରମା କରି ଦେବୀ ଙ୍କ ପୂର୍ବତନ ଗୋଶାଳା ଅଭିମୁଖେ ନାଚି ନାଚି ଚାଲିଥାଏ। ଗୋଶାଳା ନିକଟରେ ନିସ୍ତେଜ ହୋଇ ପତିତ ହୁଏ ଓ କାଳିକା ନାଚ ର ସମାପ୍ତି ଘଟିଥାଏ।

ରାତ୍ରି ଧୂପ, ଗୀତଗୋବିନ୍ଦ ପାଠ ଓ ବଡସିଂହାର ପରେ ଭ୍ରମଣୀ ନୀତି ଅନୁଷ୍ଠିତ ହୋଇଥାଏ।ମା' ଙ୍କର ବଡସିଂହାର ଧୂପ ସରିବା ପରେ ମା' ଙ୍କର ଚଳନ୍ତି ପ୍ରତିମା ଓ ଦୁର୍ଗା ପ୍ରତିମା ଙ୍କୁ ଗୋଟିଏ ଆସନରେ ରଖି ମା' ଙ୍କର ମନ୍ଦିର ର ବେଢା କୁ ତିନି ଥର ପରିକ୍ରମା କରାଯାଇଥାଏ। ଏହାପରେ ମନ୍ଦିର କୁ ଫେରାଇ ନିଆଯାଇ ସିଂହାସନ ଉପରେ 'ଭ୍ରମଣୀ ଭୋଗ' ନାମରେ ଏକ ବାଲ୍ୟ ଭୋଗ ଅର୍ପଣ କରାଯାଇଥାଏ। ଏହାପରେ ମା' ଙ୍କର ପହଡ ପଡିଥାଏ।

ପଞ୍ଚମ ପାଳି ମଙ୍ଗଳବାର (ଝାମୁ ଯାତ୍ରା)

ରାତି ତିନିଘଡି ଥାଇ ମନ୍ଦିର ଦ୍ବାରଫିଟା ପରେ ମଙ୍ଗଳ ଆଳତି, ଭିତର ଶୋଧ, ସ୍ନାନ, ବେଶ, ଚନ୍ଦନ ଲାଗି ପରେ ସୂର୍ଯ୍ୟପୂଜା, ବଲ୍ଲଭ ନୀତି କରାଯାଏ। ବଲ୍ଲଭ ନୀତି ପରେ ପ୍ରାରମ୍ଭିକ ସମୟରେ ସକାଳ ଧୂପ କରାଯାଏ ଏବଂ ବନ୍ଦାପନା ଆଳତୀ ପରେ ସର୍ବସାଧାରଣ ଦର୍ଶନ ପାଇଁ ସାହାଣମେଲା କରାଦିଆଯାଏ। ଏବଂ ମା ଙ୍କର ରାଜରାଜେଶ୍ଵରୀ ବେଶ ଦର୍ଶନ କରିବା ସହ ସୀମନ୍ତିନୀ ଗଣ ମନ୍ଦିର ବେଢାରେ ପନ୍ଥେଇ ପୂଜା କରିଥାନ୍ତି।

ପ୍ରାୟତଃ ମଧ୍ୟାହ୍ନ ସମୟରେ ଶାରଳା ପୀଠ ରୁ ଆସିଥିବା ଛଅଜଣ ମାଳୀ (ରାଉଳ) ସେବକ ମାନେ ଓ ପାଞ୍ଚଜଣ ଭୋଇ (ହରିଜନ) ସେବକ ମାନେ ପାଟୁକା ନୃତ୍ଯ କରିଥାନ୍ତି। ଭୋଇ ପାଟୁକା ମାନେ ବେଢା ବାହାରେ ଓ ମାଳୀ ପାଟୁକା ମାନେ ବେଢା ଭିତରେ ନାଚିଥାନ୍ତି। ଦ୍ବିପ୍ରହର ଧୂପ ପୂର୍ବରୁ ପାଟୁକା ମାନେ ମା' ଙ୍କୁ ଦର୍ଶନ କରନ୍ତି। ମାଳୀ ପାଟୁକା ମା' ଙ୍କର ଆଜ୍ଞାମାଳ ପାଇବା ପରେ ବାହାରେ ଅପେକ୍ଷା କରିଥିବା ଭୋଇ ପାଟୁକା ଙ୍କ ସହ ଯୋଗ ଦିଅନ୍ତି। ପ୍ରତ୍ୟେକ ସ୍ୱତନ୍ତ୍ର ପାଟୁକା ପୋଷାକ ପିନ୍ଧିଥାନ୍ତି ଓ ଗୋଟିଏ ଲେଖା କାଷ୍ଠ ଦଣ୍ଡ ସହିତ ପିତ୍ତଳ ନିର୍ମିତ ପଞ୍ଚମୁଖୀ ଘଟ ଧାରଣ କରିଥାନ୍ତି। ଘଣ୍ଟ, ଢୋଲ ଓ କାହାଳୀ ମଧ୍ଯରେ ପ୍ରାଚୀ ନଦୀ ର ଘଟତୋଳା ତୁଠ କୁ ଗମନ କରି ସେଠାରେ ପଞ୍ଚମୁଖୀ ଘାଟିରେ ପ୍ରାଚୀ ରୁ ପାଣି ତୋଳି ସାରି ମନ୍ଦିର କୁ ଫେରନ୍ତି। ଭୋଇ ପାଟୁକା ମାନେ ବାହାରେ ଅପେକ୍ଷା କରନ୍ତି ଓ ମାଳୀ ପାଟୁକା ମାନେ ବେଢା ମଧ୍ୟକୁ ପ୍ରବେଶ କରନ୍ତି। ଭଣ୍ଡ ଧୂପ ପରେ ଆଳତି ଦର୍ଶନ କରି ପାଟୁକା ମାନେ ନୃତ୍ୟରତ ହୁଅନ୍ତି। ଘଣ୍ଟ ପାଟୁଆ ସେବକ ମାନେ ନିଜକୁ ନାରୀ ବେଶରେ ସଜାଇ ହୋଇଥାନ୍ତି।

ଏହି ପଞ୍ଚମ ପାଳି ମଙ୍ଗଳବାର, ଯେଉଁଦିନ କି ମା' ଙ୍କର ମୂଖ୍ଯ ଭକ୍ତ ହଟ, ବଟ ଙ୍କ ଆରାଧନା ରେ ଦେବୀ ପ୍ରାଚୀ ଗର୍ଭ ରୁ ଉତ୍ଥିତା ହୋଇଥିଲେ, ମା' ଙ୍କର ସର୍ବଶ୍ରେଷ୍ଠ ପର୍ବ "ଝାମୁଯାତ୍ରା" ଭାବରେ ପାଳନ କରାଯାଏ। ପ୍ରାୟ ଅଧିକାଂଶ ବର୍ଷ ମା' ଙ୍କର ଝାମୁଯାତ୍ରା ବୈଶାଖ ମାସର ପ୍ରଥମ ମଙ୍ଗଳବାର ଦିନ ହୋଇଥାଏ। ଏହିଦିନ ସିଂହଦ୍ଵାର ସମ୍ମୁଖରେ ପ୍ରାୟ ୨୦ ଫୁଟ ଲମ୍ବ, ୨ ଫୁଟ ପ୍ରସ୍ଥ ଓ ୧ ଫୁଟ ଗଭୀର ର ଏକ ଖନ୍ଦକ ଖୋଲାଯାଇ ଅଙ୍ଗାରନିଆଁ କରାଯାଇ ଏଥିରେ ଝୁଣା ଦିଆଯାଇଥାଏ। ପାଟୁକା ମାନେ ଖାଲି ପାଦରେ ସେଥିରେ ପ୍ରବେଶ କରି ନୃତ୍ଯ କରନ୍ତି। ପାଟୁକା ନୃତ୍ଯ ସମାପନ ହୁଏ। ଏହିଦିନମାନଙ୍କରେ ଭକ୍ତ ମାନେ ପୂଣ୍ୟତୋୟା ପ୍ରାଚୀ ନଦୀରେ ସ୍ନାନ କରି ମା' ଙ୍କର ପବିତ୍ର ପାଦ ଦର୍ଶନ କରି ଅକ୍ଷୟ ପୂଣ୍ୟ ଅର୍ଜନ କରିଥାନ୍ତି।

ଏହାପରେ ମନ୍ଦିର ଗର୍ଭଗୃହ ଖାଲି କରାଯାଇ ଦ୍ବିପ୍ରହର ଧୂପ ଓ ଭଅଣ୍ଡ ଧୂପ କରାଯାଏ ଏବଂ ଦ୍ବିପ୍ରହର ପହୁଡ ପଡେ। ସଂନ୍ଧ୍ଯା ଆଳତି କରାଯାଇ ଉଲାଗି ଓ ମାର୍ଜନା କରାଯାଏ। ବେଶ ପରେ ଭାଗବତ ପାଠ ହୁଏ ।

ପ୍ରାୟତଃ ମଧ୍ଯରାତ୍ରି ସମୟରେ କାଳିକା ନୃତ୍ୟ ଅନୁଷ୍ଠିତ ହୋଇଥାଏ। ଏକ ନିର୍ଦ୍ଦିଷ୍ଟ ଖମାରେଇ ପରିବାର ଏଥିପାଇଁ ଉଦ୍ଦିଷ୍ଟ। ନିର୍ଦ୍ଦିଷ୍ଟ ବ୍ୟକ୍ତି ଦିନସାରା ଉପବାସ କରିଥାଏ। ରାତ୍ରି ପ୍ରାୟ ୧୧ ଟାରେ ଦେବୀ ଙ୍କର ପୂର୍ବତନ ଗୋଶାଳା ରେ ମହାକାଳୀ ବେଶରେ ସଜ୍ଜିତ ହୋଇ ଖଡ୍ଗ ଧାରଣ ପୂର୍ବକ ଘଣ୍ଟ, ଢୋଲ, ମହୁରୀ, ମଶାଲ ମଧ୍ୟରେ ମା ଙ୍କ ମନ୍ଦିର ଅଭିମୁଖେ ନାଚି ନାଚି ଯାତ୍ରା କରେ। ଏକଥର ବେଢା ପରିକ୍ରମା କରି ମନ୍ଦିର ମଧ୍ଯକୁ ପ୍ରବେଶ କରେ। ମା ଙ୍କର ସଂନ୍ଧ୍ଯା ଆଳତି ର ପରବର୍ତ୍ତୀ ବେଶକୁ ଦର୍ଶନ କରି ଦକ୍ଷିଣ ଦ୍ବାର ଦେଇ ନିର୍ଗତ ହୁଏ। ନାନା ବାଦ୍ୟ ମଧ୍ୟରେ ଓ ଦର୍ଶକ ମାନଙ୍କ ଦ୍ଵାରା ବେଷ୍ଟିତ ହୋଇ ଏହି ପଞ୍ଚମ ପାଳିରେ ପାଞ୍ଚ ଥର ବେଢା ପରିକ୍ରମା କରି କାକଟେଇଙ୍କ ମନ୍ଦିରକୁ ତିନି ଥର ପରିକ୍ରମା କରି ଦେବୀ ଙ୍କ ପୂର୍ବତନ ଗୋଶାଳା ଅଭିମୁଖେ ନାଚି ନାଚି ଚାଲିଥାଏ। ଗୋଶାଳା ନିକଟରେ ନିସ୍ତେଜ ହୋଇ ପତିତ ହୁଏ ଓ କାଳିକା ନାଚ ର ସମାପ୍ତି ଘଟିଥାଏ।

ରାତ୍ରି ଧୂପ, ଗୀତଗୋବିନ୍ଦ ପାଠ ଓ ବଡସିଂହାର ପରେ ଭ୍ରମଣୀ ନୀତି ଅନୁଷ୍ଠିତ ହୋଇଥାଏ।ମା' ଙ୍କର ବଡସିଂହାର ଧୂପ ସରିବା ପରେ ମା' ଙ୍କର ଚଳନ୍ତି ପ୍ରତିମା ଓ ଦୁର୍ଗା ପ୍ରତିମା ଙ୍କୁ ଗୋଟିଏ ଆସନରେ ରଖି ମା' ଙ୍କର ମନ୍ଦିର ର ବେଢା କୁ ତିନି ଥର ପରିକ୍ରମା କରାଯାଇଥାଏ। ଏହାପରେ ମନ୍ଦିର କୁ ଫେରାଇ ନିଆଯାଇ ସିଂହାସନ ଉପରେ 'ଭ୍ରମଣୀ ଭୋଗ' ନାମରେ ଏକ ବାଲ୍ୟ ଭୋଗ ଅର୍ପଣ କରାଯାଇଥାଏ। ଏହାପରେ ମା' ଙ୍କର ପହଡ ପଡିଥାଏ।

ଝାମୁଜାତା୍ (ମା ମଙ୍ଗଳା କାକଟପୁର)
ଚୈତ୍ର ମାସର ପ୍ରତି ମଙ୍ଗଳବାର ଦିନ ଠକୁରାଣୀକ°ର ”ଚୈତର୍ପବ” ପାଳନ ହୁଏ। ଶେଷ ମଙ୍ଗଳବାର ଦିନ ଘଣ୍ଟ ପାଟୁଆ ମାନେ ମଙ୍ଗଳାଙ୍କ ବେଢାରେ ଗାତ ଖୋଳି ନିଆ ଦହ ଉପରେ ଚାଲନତି। ଏହି ଚାଲିବା କାର୍ଯ୍ୟ ଦେଖିବା ପାଇଁ ସେହି ଦିନ ହଜାର ହଜାର ଭକ୍ତ ମଙ୍ଗଳା ଵେଢାରେ ଏକତ୍ର ହୋଇ ଥାଆନ୍ତି। ଚୈତର୍ ମାସ ରେ ଏହି ଝାମୁଯାତ ପାଇଁ କାକଟପୁରରେ ମାସାଧି କାଳ ବିରାଟ ମେଳା ହୁଏ । ଏହି ଯାତ ଦେଖିବା ପାଇଁ ସବୁବରଷ ଲକ୍ଷ ଲକ୍ଷ ସରଧାଳୁକ° ସମାଗମ ହୁଏ।

ଖୁଦୁରୁକୁଣୀ ପୂଜା
ଖୁଦୁରୁକୁଣୀ ପୂଜା ଓଡିଶାର ଏକ ମୌଳିକ ପର୍ବ। ଉକ୍ତ ପୂଜାର ଆରାଧ୍ୟା ହେଉଛନ୍ତି ସିଂହବାହିନୀ ମା ମଙ୍ଗଳା। ଖୁଦଭଜା ଓ ଖୁଦପିଠା ଭୋଗ ବଢାଯାଉଥିବାରୁ ଉକ୍ତ ପର୍ବର ନାମ ଖୁଦୁରୁକୁଣୀ। ଏହି ଓଷାରେ ମା ମଙ୍ଗଳା ଙ୍କୁ ଆରାଧନା ଠାକୁରାଣୀଙ୍କୁ ଖୁଦୁରୁକୁଣୀ ବୋଲି କାହିଁକି କୁହାଯାଏ 'ତଅପୋଇ' କଥାରେ ତାହା ସୁ-ସ୍ପଷ୍ଟ। କେତେକଙ୍କ ମତରେ ଖୁଦୁରୁକୁଣୀ ଶବ୍ଦଟି 'ଖୁଦରଙ୍କୁଣୀ' ଶବ୍ଦର ଅପଭ୍ରଂଶ ମାତ୍ର। ଅନ୍ୟ କେତେକଙ୍କ ମତରେ ମା' ମଙ୍ଗଳା ପ୍ରାଚୀନ ଉତ୍କଳର ନୌବାଣିଜ୍ୟ ସହିତ ସଂପୃକ୍ତ ଦେବୀ। ପୁରାକାଳରୁ ଆମ ଦେଶର ସାଧବ ପୁତ୍ର ବାଣିଜ୍ଯ ଅନୁକୁଳ କଲାବେଳେ ବୋଇତରେ ଦେବୀ ମଙ୍ଗଳା ଙ୍କର ଅପାର କରୁଣା ର ସଙ୍କେତ ସ୍ୱରୂପ ମୂର୍ତ୍ତି ସ୍ଥାପନ କରାଯାଇଥାଏ। ନୌକା ଏକ ପବିତ୍ର ସ୍ଥାନ ହେଉଛି ମଙ୍ଗ। ତେଣୁ ମନେହୁଏ ଏହି ମଙ୍ଗରେ ହିଁ ମା ମଙ୍ଗଳା ବିରାଜମାନ ହେଉଥିଲେ। ନୌକା ର ଏକ କ୍ଷୁଦ୍ର କୋଣରେ ମଙ୍ଗଳା ସ୍ଥାପିତ ହେଉଥିଲେ ବୋଲି ତାଙ୍କ ନାମ 'କ୍ଷୁଦ୍ରକୋଣୀ ଠାକୁରାଣୀ' ହୋଇଥାଇପାରେ। କାଳକ୍ରମେ କ୍ଷୁଦ୍ରକୋଣୀ ଅପଭ୍ରଂଶ ହୋଇ ଖୁଦୁରୁକୁଣୀ ବା ଖୁଦରଙ୍କୁଣୀ ବୋଲି ପ୍ରଚଳିତ ହୋଇଛି। ଖୁଦୁରୁକୁଣୀ ମା' ଙ୍କର ଅନ୍ୟ ଏକ ନାମ ହେଉଛି ଭାଲୁକୁଣୀ । ମନେହୁଏ ଭାଲୁକୁଣୀ 'ବାଲୁକୁଣୀ' ର ଅପଭ୍ରଂଶ ଶବ୍ଦ।

"ସ୍ନାହାନ ନିମନ୍ତେ ନଦୀକୁ ଯାଇ, ସ୍ନାନ ସାରି ମନେ ମଙ୍ଗଳା ଧ୍ୟାୟୀ।
ଓଦାବସ୍ତ୍ରେ ନଦୀକୂଳରେ ବସି, ବାଲୁକା ପୂଜନ୍ତି ବାଳିକା ମିଶି।।"
ନଦୀ ବାଲିରେ ମୂର୍ତ୍ତିଗଠନର ପ୍ରଚେଷ୍ଟା ଯୋଗୁ ସେ ବାଲୁକୁଣୀ ହୋଇପାରନ୍ତି।

ଖୁଦୁରୁକୁଣୀ ଓଷାରେ ଧାର୍ମିକ ମୂଲ୍ୟବୋଧ ସହିତ ଜାତୀୟ, ଐତିହାସିକ, ସାମାଜିକ ଓ ବୈଜ୍ଞାନିକ ମୂଲ୍ୟବୋଧ ମଧ୍ଯ ରହିଛି। ପରିବାରରେ ଭାଇଭଉଣୀଙ୍କ ମଧ୍ୟରେ ଥିବା ପାରସ୍ପରିକ ସ୍ନେହ, ଶ୍ରଦ୍ଧା, ଭକ୍ତି ଓ ଅନୁରାଗର ଚିତ୍ର ତଅପୋଇ କାହାଣୀରେ ପ୍ରତିଫଳିତ। ପରିବାରର ସୁଖ-ଶାନ୍ତି ନିମନ୍ତେ ନଣନ୍ଦ-ଭାଉଜ ମଧ୍ୟରେ କିପ୍ରକାର ସୌହାର୍ଦ୍ଦ୍ୟ ରହିବା ଆବଶ୍ୟକ ଓ ସମବୟସ୍କା ନଣନ୍ଦ ଭାଉଜ ଦୁହେଁ ଏକତ୍ର ସଖୀ ବା ବାନ୍ଧବୀ ପରି ଚଳିବା ଉଚିତ୍ ତାହା ଏହି ଉପାଖ୍ୟାନ ରେ ସୁସ୍ପଷ୍ଟ। ପରିବାରର ସ୍ତ୍ରୀଲୋକ ମାନେ କିପରି ପରର କୁମନ୍ତ୍ରଣା ରେ ପଡି ଆପଣାର ଲୋକମାନଙ୍କୁ ବହୁ ଦୁଃଖକଷ୍ଟ ଦେଇଥାନ୍ତି ତାହା ଏହି କଥାବସ୍ତୁରୁ ବାରି ହୋଇପଡେ। ଏହା ହିଁ ତଅପୋଇ ଉପାଖ୍ୟାନର ସାମାଜିକ ମୂଲ୍ୟବୋଧ।

ଏଥି ବର୍ଣ୍ଣିତ ନୌବାଣିଜ୍ୟ ପରମ୍ପରା ହିଁ ଉତ୍କଳ ଇତିହାସର ବାର୍ତ୍ତା ପ୍ରଚାର କରେ। ଏହି ବ୍ରତ କଥାରେ ବର୍ଣ୍ଣିତ ଅଛି ଦେବକୀ ଦ୍ଵାରକାରେ ସମସ୍ତ ଯୁବତୀ ଗଣଙ୍କ ଉପସ୍ଥିତି ରେ ଉକ୍ତ ବର୍ଣ୍ଣର ମାହାତ୍ମ୍ୟ ବର୍ଣ୍ଣନା କରିଥିଲେ। ତେଣୁ ଏହା ଏକ ମାତୃଜାତୀୟ ଓଷା। ତେଣୁ ମାତୃ ଜାତିକୁ ଗଢିବା ନିମନ୍ତେ ଏହି ଓଷାର ସୃଷ୍ଟି।ଏହି ଓଷାକୁ କୁମାରୀ ଟି ଏକାକିନୀ ଗୃହରେ ନକରି ସାହିଯାକର କୁମାରୀ ମାନଙ୍କ ମେଳରେ ପାଳନ କରିଥାଏ। ଏହି ଗଣଓଷାରେ ନିଜସ୍ବ ସତ୍ତା ହରାଇ ଗଣସତ୍ତାରେ ଏକାକର ହୋଇଯାନ୍ତି।ଏକତ୍ର ପୂଜା କରିବା ଦ୍ବାରା ସାମାଜିକ ଏକ ମିଳନ ହୋଇଥାଏ। ସାମାଜିକ ମିଳନ ହିଁ ଏକତାର ଜନ୍ମଦାତା। ଏକତା ହିଁ ଜାତୀୟ ସଂହତିର ମୂଳମନ୍ତ୍ର। ଅତଏବ ଜାତୀୟ ସଂହତି ସ୍ଥାପନରେ ଉକ୍ତ ଓଷା ସହାୟକ ହୋଇଥାଏ। ଏକତ୍ର ସମାବେଶ ହିଁ ଆନନ୍ଦ ଓ ବନ୍ଧୁତ୍ୱ ଆଣିଦେଇଥାଏ।

ସ୍ୱାସ୍ଥ୍ୟନୀତି ଦୃଷ୍ଟିରୁ ଖୁଦୁରୁକୁଣୀ ଓଷା ମଧ୍ୟ ଗୁରୁତ୍ୱପୂର୍ଣ୍ଣ। ଏହି ପୂଜା ଢିଙ୍କିଶାଳରେ କରିବାର ତାତ୍ପର୍ଯ୍ୟ ହେଉଛି ଢିଙ୍କିକୁଟା ଚାଉଳରୁ ପ୍ରସ୍ତୁତ ବଗଡା ଭାତରେ ଜୀବନିକା ଭରପୁର ଥାଏ, ଯାହା ଆମର ସ୍ୱାସ୍ଥ୍ୟବର୍ଦ୍ଧକ। ଏହି ପୂଜାର ଏକ ଆକର୍ଷଣ ହେଉଛି କୁମାରୀ ମାନଙ୍କର ପୁଞ୍ଚିଖେଳ। ଓଷାଦିନ ସଂନ୍ଧ୍ଯା ସମୟରେ ପୂଜା ସ୍ଥାନରେ ସମବେତ କୁମାରୀ ମାନଙ୍କ ମଧ୍ୟରେ ପୁଞ୍ଚି ପ୍ରତିଯୋଗିତା ହୋଇଥାଏ। ଏହି ଖେଳରେ ଅଙ୍ଗପ୍ରତ୍ୟଙ୍ଗ ର ସଞ୍ଚାଳନ ହେତୁ ଭବିଷ୍ଯତର ସୌଷ୍ଠବାନ୍ୱିତ କମନୀୟ ସ୍ୱାସ୍ଥ୍ୟ ଉତ୍କର୍ଷ ଲାଭ କରିଥାଏ। ପୂଜାସ୍ଥାନ ଓ ଗୃହ ପରିଷ୍କରଣ ଅର୍ଥାତ୍ ଗୃହକୁ ଗୋମୟରେ ଲିପାପୋଛା କରିବା ଫଳରେ କୀଟାଣୁ ମାନେ ନଷ୍ଟ ହୋଇଯାନ୍ତି। ବିଶେଷତଃ କୁମାରୀମାନେ ଏସବୁ କାର୍ଯ୍ୟ କରିବା ଫଳରେ ସେ ଅଳସୋଇ, ମଠୋଇ ପରିବର୍ତ୍ତେ କର୍ମଠ ଓ ଚଞ୍ଚଳା ହୋଇଥାନ୍ତି। ଯଦ୍ୱାରା ପରବର୍ତ୍ତୀ କାଳରେ ଅର୍ଥାତ୍ ଶ୍ୱଶୂରାଳୟରେ ସେମାନେ ପ୍ରଶଂସିତ ହେବା ସହିତ ସମସ୍ତଙ୍କର ଶ୍ରଦ୍ଧା ଭାଜନ ହୋଇଥାନ୍ତି।

ସତ୍ୟଯୁଗର ସାଧବ ଲଳନା ତଅପୋଇ କାହାଣୀକୁ ବର୍ତ୍ତମାନ ପରିପ୍ରେକ୍ଷୀରେ ଆମେ ମନଗଢା କାହାଣୀ କହି ହସରେ ଉଡାଇଦେଇଥାଉ। ତଥାପି ତଅପୋଇ ପରି ଜନୈକା ନାରୀ ମାନଙ୍କର ଅଚଳ ନିଷ୍ଠା ଓ ଭକ୍ତି ଆମର ଏ ଯୁଗ କାହିଁକି ଆଗାମୀ ଅନିଶ୍ଚିତ ଦିନରେ ହେବ ଆମ୍ଭମାନଙ୍କର ଆଦର୍ଶ। ମଙ୍ଗଳବାରରେ ମଙ୍ଗଳାଙ୍କ ପୂଜା କରିବାର ବିଧାନ ରହିଥିବା ବେଳେ ସୌରବାର ରବିବାରକୁ ମଙ୍ଗଳା ପୂଜା ପାଇଁ ଚୟନ କରିବା ମୂଳରେ ହୁଏତ ସୌର ଚେତନାକୁ ଅସ୍ୱୀକାର କରାଯାଇପାରିବ ନାହିଁ।

ଦେବସ୍ନାନ ପୂର୍ଣ୍ଣିମା ନୀତି ( ମା ମଙ୍ଗଳା ମନ୍ଦିର)
ମା' ଙ୍କର ସୂର୍ଯ୍ୟପୂଜା ଓ ବଲ୍ଲଭ ଭୋଗ ପରେ ମନ୍ଦିର ବେଢାସ୍ଥିତ ପତିତପାବନ ଙ୍କର ଦେବସ୍ନାନ ନୀତି ପାଇଁ ପହଣ୍ଡି ଆରମ୍ଭ ହୋଇଥାଏ। ଦିଅଁ ପହଣ୍ଡି ରେ ଯାଇ ଦେବସ୍ନାନ ମଣ୍ଡପ ରେ ବିଜେ କରନ୍ତି। ସେଠାରେ ଶ୍ରୀବିଗ୍ରହ ଙ୍କର ଅବକାଶ ଆଦି ନୀତି ପରେ ଜଳପୂଜା ଓ ସ୍ନାନ ଆରମ୍ଭ ହୁଏ। ସ୍ନାନ ପରେ ବେଶ ବଢେ।
ପୂଜାପଣ୍ଡା ସ୍ନାନ ପରେ ଆସି ମା ଙ୍କ ସକାଳଧୂପ, ମଧ୍ୟାହ୍ନ ଧୂପ ଆଦି ନୀତି ସମାପନ କରିବା ପରେ ଦେବସ୍ନାନ ମଣ୍ଡପ କୁ ମଦନମୋହନ ବିଜେ ହୁଅନ୍ତି ଓ ସେଠାରେ ଖେଚୁଡ଼ି ଧୂପ ହୁଏ ଏବଂ ମଦନମୋହନ ପ୍ରତ୍ୟାବର୍ତ୍ତନ କରନ୍ତି।
ସଂଧ୍ୟା ଆଳତି ପୂର୍ବରୁ ପତିତପାବନ ଙ୍କର ଗଜାନନ ବେଶ ଓ ମା ଙ୍କର ପୁନଃମାର୍ଜନା କରାଯାଇ ସର୍ବାଙ୍ଗ ଚନ୍ଦନ ବେଶ ନୀତି କରାଯାଏ। ସଂମ୍ପୂର୍ଣ୍ଣ ଶରୀର କୁ ଚନ୍ଦନ ରେ ଆବୃତ କରାଯାଏ ଏବଂ ଦର୍ଶନାର୍ଥେ ସାହାଣମେଲା କରାଯାଏ। ପରେ ସଂଧ୍ୟା ଆଳତୀ ବଢିଥାଏ। ରାତ୍ର ଧୂପ ପରେ ବଡସିଂହାର ରେ ଏକ ସ୍ଵତନ୍ତ୍ର ଧୂପ ଅନୁଷ୍ଠିତ ହୋଇ ପହୁଡ ପଡେ।
ରାତ୍ର ଧୂପ ପରେ ସ୍ନାନ ମଣ୍ଡପରେ ପତିତପାବନ ଙ୍କର ଦକ୍ଷିଣ ମୋଡ ଆଳତୀ କରାଯାଇ ପହଣ୍ଡି ରେ ନିଆଯାଏ ଏବଂ ଅଣସର ପିଣ୍ଡିରେ ବିଜେ କରାଯାଏ।

Someshwar Temple (ସମେଶ୍ବର ଶମ୍ଭୁ)
ପ୍ରାଚୀ ଉପତ୍ୟକା ରେ ମଙ୍ଗଳା ଉପାସନା ସହିତ ଶମ୍ଭୁ ଓ ମାଧବ ଉପାସନା ପରମ୍ପରା ମଧ୍ୟ ବହୁ ପ୍ରାଚୀନ ।ଦ୍ବାଦଶ ଶମ୍ଭୁ ମାନଙ୍କ ମଧ୍ୟ ରେ ସମେଶ୍ବର ଶମ୍ଭୁ ମଙ୍ଗଳା ଉପାସନା ରେ ଓତଃପ୍ରୋତ ଭାବେ ଜଡିତ ।
ସମେଶ୍ବର ଶମ୍ଭୁ ଙ୍କ ମନ୍ଦିର ଅତି ପ୍ରଚୀନ ନହେଲେ ମଧ୍ୟ ଏହାଙ୍କ ଇତିହାସ ଖୁବ୍ ପୁରୁଣା । ମନ୍ଦିର ରେ ସମେଶ୍ବର ଶମ୍ଭୁ ଙ୍କ ଲିଙ୍ଗଶକ୍ତି ସହ ପାର୍ଶ୍ବ ଦେବତା ଭାବେ ମା ପାର୍ବତୀ,ବିନାୟକ,କୁମାର କାର୍ତ୍ତିକ ଙ୍କ ସହ ନବଗ୍ରହ ଓ ଚାମୁଣ୍ଡା ଆଦି ବିଗ୍ରହ ପୂଜାପାଇଥାନ୍ତି।
ମଙ୍ଗଳା ଠାକୁରାଣୀ ଙ୍କର ସେବାୟତ ମାନଙ୍କ ର ସେବାପାଳି ସମେଶ୍ବର ମନ୍ଦିର ରେ ଖଞ୍ଜା ଯାଇଛି ।ପ୍ରତିଦିନ ସେବାୟତ ମାନଙ୍କ ଦ୍ଵାରା ଆଳତୀ ଅବକାଶ ଖେଚୁଡି ଧୂପ ଆଦି କରାଯାଇଥାଏ । ଶୀତଳଷଷ୍ଠୀ ଏବଂ ମହାଶିବରାତ୍ରି ଏଠାରେ ଧୂମଧାମ ରେ ପାଳନ କରାଯାଏ।ଏହି ଦିନ ମାନଙ୍କ ରେ ମଙ୍ଗଳା ମନ୍ଦିର ମୁଖଶାଳା ଠଣା ରେ ଥିବା ସମେଶ୍ବର ଙ୍କର ଚଳନ୍ତି ପ୍ରତିମା ଚନ୍ଦ୍ରଶେଖର ମାଜଣା ହୋଇ ତାଙ୍କ ମନ୍ଦିର କୁ ବିଜେ କରନ୍ତି । ପୂଜା ଆଦି ପରେ ବାହୁଡିଥାନ୍ତି । ଚୈତ୍ର ମାସ ରେ ମଧ୍ୟ ଚନ୍ଦ୍ରଶେଖର ମେଳନ ପଡିଆ କୁ ବିଜେ କରନ୍ତି।
ବିଜୟାଦଶମୀ ରେ ମଙ୍ଗଳା ଠାକୁରାଣୀ ଙ୍କର ଚଳନ୍ତି ପ୍ରତିମା ଏବଂ କନକଦୁର୍ଗା ହରଦୁର୍ଗା ଭେଟ ନୀତି ପାଇଁ ସମେଶ୍ବର ମନ୍ଦିର କୁ ବିଜେ କରନ୍ତି ।
କିମ୍ବଦନ୍ତୀ ଅନୁସାରେ ସମେଶ୍ବର ପୀଠ ରେ ଲଙ୍କେଶ୍ବର ବୀଭିଷଣ
ଆହ୍ନିକ ପୂଜା ସଂପାଦନ କରିଥିଲେ ।

"ତତୋ ଗତା ସା ସଂପ୍ଳାବ୍ୟ ଗ୍ରାମେଶଂ ଦେବମୀଶ୍ବରମ୍।
ଯତ୍ରାସ୍ତେ ଦେବଦେବେଶଃ ସୋମଃ ସୋମାର୍ଦ୍ଧଶେଖରଃ।
ଯତ୍ର ଲଙ୍କେଶ୍ବରୋ ଦେବୋ ଦୈତ୍ୟରାଜା ବିଭୀଷଣଃ
କରୋତି ବିଧିବତ୍ ବିପ୍ରାଃ ! ଆହ୍ନିକାର୍ହଣମମ୍ଭସି ।"
ସାକ୍ଷୀ - ଜନ୍ଜାଳି ମାଧବ
ତୀର୍ଥ - ବିଶ୍ଵାମିତ୍ର ଆଶ୍ରମ , ବିଦ୍ୟାଧର ତୀର୍ଥ , ଚକ୍ରତୀର୍ଥ

Transport
The temple is reachable by the roads from Cuttack, Bhubaneswar, Puri, Jagatsinghpur and Paradeep which are approximately 69 km, 60 km, 55 km, 38 km and 83 km respectively. The nearest railway stations are Bhubaneswar and Puri. The nearest airport is in Bhubaneswar.

References

  3.Maa Mangala Temple Kakatpur

Hindu temples in Puri district
Shakti temples